Westonia may refer to:

 Elizabeth Jane Weston (1582-1612), English-Czech poet known as Westonia
 Westonia, Western Australia, a town
 Westonia (brachiopod); see List of brachiopod genera